Hinau may refer to:
Elaeocarpus dentatus, a New Zealand native tree
HMNZS Hinau, the name of two ships of the Royal New Zealand Navy